The Bighorn Fire was a wildfire in the Santa Catalina Mountains north of Tucson, Arizona. It burned  until it was finally put out on July 23, 2020. A lightning strike from a storm at 9:46 PM on June 5, 2020 caused the fire. The fire was named after the bighorn sheep that inhabit the area.

The fire threatened hundreds of homes and multiple evacuations occurred. The first evacuations occurred in the Catalina Foothills neighborhood in Northern Tucson. The following day, residents in the Oro Valley section of the Catalina Foothills were ordered to evacuate. On June 16, Mount Lemmon and Summerhaven were evacuated. The length of the burn was attributed to rough mountainous terrain and inaccessibility. Additionally, the dry hot weather of the area made it even more difficult to fight the fire. The first monsoon of Tucson’s monsoon season is credited with helping emergency crews get the fire under control and to eventually put it out.

References

2020 Arizona wildfires
Santa Catalina Mountains
Wildfires in Pima County, Arizona